International Peace Congress, or International Congress of the Friends of Peace, was the name of a series of international meetings of representatives from peace societies from throughout the world held in various places in Europe from 1843 to 1853. An initial congress at London in 1843 was followed by an annual series of congresses from 1848 until 1853.

London, 1843
The first International Congress was held in London at the suggestion of Joseph Sturge and on the initiative of the American Peace Society in 1843. The host was the London Peace Society. 294 British, 37 American and 6 Continental delegates attended.

Brussels, 1848
Elihu Burritt organized the Congress of 1848, the first after the French Revolution of February 1848. It was chaired by Auguste Visschers, a Belgian lawyer and philanthropist. The participants met at Brussels in September of that year.  Among the delegates were Cobden, Thierry, Girardin, and Bastiat.  The congress adopted resolutions urging limitation of armaments and the placing of a ban upon foreign loans for war purposes.

Paris, 1849
One year after Brussels, the Peace Congress met in Paris from 22 to 24 August 1849, with Victor Hugo as president  The proceedings were published by Charles Gilpin. Among the speakers were many of the chief philosophers and politicians of the time, including Frederic Bastiat, Charles Gilpin, Richard Cobden and Henry Richard William Wells Brown was invited to speak against slavery. Hugo introduced the concept of the United States of Europe.

Later congresses
Through the next decades, more congresses were convened in various cities:
 4th congress: Frankfurt am Main (1850)
 5th congress: London (1851), co-inciding with the Great Exhibition.
 6th congress: Manchester (1852) Here Richard Cobden and John Bright took part in the discussions.
 7th congress: Edinburgh (1853)
The series was interrupted by an interval of wars during which the pacifists were unable to raise their voices.

See also
 Peace congress

References

Peace Congress, International
1843 conferences
1848 conferences
1849 conferences
1850 conferences
1851 conferences
1852 conferences
1853 conferences
1843 in international relations
1848 in international relations
1849 in international relations
1850 in international relations
1851 in international relations
1852 in international relations
1853 in international relations
1843 in England
1848 in Belgium
1849 in France
1850 in Germany
1851 in England
1852 in England
1853 in Scotland